Neocicindela garnerae, the South island tiger beetle (native) (NZ), is a species of tiger beetle in the family Cicindelidae.

References

Further reading

External links

 

Cicindelidae
Beetles described in 2013